San José Las Flores may refer to several places:

San José Las Flores, Chalatenango, El Salvador
San José Las Flores, Santa Ana, El Salvador